Baron Dunboyne was a title first held by the Petit family some time after the Norman invasion of Ireland.

History
Dunboyne was part of the Lordship of Meath. The Petit family also had land holdings in Mullingar. In 1227, Ralph Petit became Bishop of Meath. In that capacity, he founded a priory of the Blessed Virgin in Mullingar and he endowed this establishment with the townland of Kilbraynan (or Kilbrena) in Dunboyne, along with the rectory of Dunboyne, its tithes and other ecclesiastical revenues. A century later, Thomas Butler, son of Theobald Butler, 4th Chief Butler of Ireland, married Sinolda, heiress of William le Petit. In 1324, Butler was created Baron Dunboyne by prescription. In this way, the Dunboyne properties and titles passed to the Butlers. In 1541, the barony was created by patent in the Peerage of Ireland. The barons are alternately numbered from the early 14th century by numbers ten greater than the number dating to the patent (e.g. the 28th/18th Baron Dunboyne died May 19, 2004). The first baron of this sequence in turn married the heiress to an earlier line of Barons Dunboyne.

The family seat is Argo Hill House, near Rotherfield, East Sussex.

Barons Dunboyne (1324)
Kiltinan Castle, Fethard, County Tipperary, was the seat of the barons until the Reformation in Ireland.
 Thomas Butler, 1st Baron Dunboyne (died October 1329)
 Pierce (Piers) Butler, 2nd Baron Dunboyne (died 08/05/1370)
 Thomas "MacPiarais" Butler, 3rd Baron Dunboyne (died 11/07/1370)
 William Butler, 4th Baron Dunboyne (died 1406)
 Pierce Butler, 5th Baron Dunboyne (died 1415)
 Edmond Butler, 6th Baron Dunboyne (died 1419)
 James Butler, 7th Baron Dunboyne (died 1445), Seneschal of Tipperary until 1457
 Edmond Butler, 8th Baron Dunboyne (died 1498), Seneschal of Tipperary from 1457 to 1478
 James Butler, 9th Baron Dunboyne (died 1508), Seneschal of Tipperary from 1478 to 1505
 James Butler, 10th Baron Dunboyne (died 1538)

Barons Dunboyne (1541)
Edmond Butler, 1st/11th Baron Dunboyne (died 1566), the son of the 10th baron, was elevated to the peerage on 11/06/1541.
James Butler, 2nd/12th Baron Dunboyne (died 1624)
Edmond Butler, 3rd/13th Baron Dunboyne (died 1640), grandson of the 2nd baron
James Butler, 4th/14th Baron Dunboyne (died 1662)
Pierce Butler, 5th/15th Baron Dunboyne (died 1690)
James Butler, 6th/16th Baron Dunboyne (died 1701)
Pierce Butler, 7th/17th Baron Dunboyne (died 1718)
Edmond Butler, 8th/18th Baron Dunboyne (died 1732)
James Butler, 9th/19th Baron Dunboyne (died 1768)
Pierce Butler, 10th/20th Baron Dunboyne (died 1773)
Pierce Edmond Creagh Butler, 11th/21st Baron Dunboyne (died 1785)
John Butler, 12th/22nd Baron Dunboyne (1720–1800), son of the 20th baron
James Butler, 13th/23rd Baron Dunboyne (1780–1850) – see note below
Theobald Fitzwalter Butler, 14th/24th Baron Dunboyne (1806–1881) (elected a Representative Peer in 1868)
James Fitzwalter Clifford-Butler, 15th/25th Baron Dunboyne (1839–1899)
Robert St John Fitzwalter Butler, 16th/26th Baron Dunboyne (1844–1913) (elected a Representative Peer in 1901)
Fitzwalter George Probyn Butler, 17th/27th Baron Dunboyne (1874–1945)
Patrick Theobald Tower Butler, 18th/28th Baron Dunboyne (often known as Paddy Dunboyne; 1917–2004) (Headed the Irish Peers Association)
John Fitzwalter Butler, 19th/29th Baron Dunboyne (1951–2013)
Richard Pierce Theobald Butler, 20th/30th Baron Dunboyne (b. 1983)

The heir apparent is the present holder's son Hon. Caspian Fitzwalter Butler.

Note As a Roman Catholic bishop, when the 12th/22nd baron inherited the titles, he feared that his vows of celibacy would lead to the extinguishment of the titles altogether. Following the refusal of the Pope to release him from his vows, he Apostatised, embraced the Church of Ireland and married late in life in the hope of fathering an heir. Following the death of a son in infancy, it looked like the title would indeed become extinct. However, a distant relative of the 2nd/12th baron was found in County Clare who succeeded to the title. His ancestry is as follows:

James Butler, 2nd/12th Baron Dunboyne married Margaret O'Brien. Their son,
 Edward Butler married Elizabeth Dobbin. Their son,
 James Butler married Janet Cantwell, daughter of Captain John Cantwell. Their son,
 Edward Butler, was the father of
 James Butler (died 1774) was the Roman Catholic Archbishop of Cashel
 Michael Butler (died 15 Aug 1776) married Mary O'Leary. Their son: 
 James Butler (died 22 May 1784) married Bridget Sheehy, daughter of Bartholomew Sheehy. He lived at Cragnagowra, County Clare. Their son:
 James Butler, 13th/23rd Baron Dunboyne (born 25 July 1780), was the great-great-great-grandson of the 2nd/12th baron. He married Eleanor, daughter of David O’Connell, on 17 August 1799.

See also
Dunboyne

References

Attribution

 
1324 establishments in Ireland
1541 establishments in Ireland
Baronies in the Peerage of Ireland
Noble titles created in 1324
Noble titles created in 1541
Butler dynasty